The ʾAkhbāri's are a minority of Twelver Shia Muslims who follow the Quran and Hadith, and unlike the majority Usuli branch of Shi'ism, reject the use of reasoning in deriving verdicts in Islamic jurisprudence.

The term ʾAkhbāri's (from khabāra, news or report) is usually used in contrast to Usuli (from Uṣūl al-fiqh, principles of Islamic jurisprudence). Unlike Usulis, Akhbaris do not follow or do Taqleed of a Mujtahid, the marja‘s (models for imitation) who practice modern form of ijtihad (independent legal reasoning); consequently they do not accept Usul al-fiqh. Akhbaris perform Taqleed of Imam Muhammad al-Mahdi the Twelfth Imam of Shias who is in the Occultation. They say Taqleed is permissible when it is performed of an infallible Hujja, whereas they consider Taqleed to be forbidden when it is performed of a non-Infallible. Contrary to Usulis, Akhbaris believe in the perpetuity of Sharia from only the infalibles, so the right to interpret the Quran is only to 14 infallibles who have complete in-depth gnostic knowledge (al-rāsikhūn fi al-ʿilm ). Whereas the former believe in the development of jurisprudence with time 'Uṣūl al-fiqh', Akhbaris seek religious rulings or Islamic jurisprudence from a dead or living Muhaddith, who has narrated or narrates the rulings hadith of The Fourteen Infallibles without interpreting it. Further Akhbaris say that The Fourteen Infallibles or Shia Imāms allegedly never permitted Ijtehad.

Although Usulis and Akhbaris use the same Hadiths, they differ in many aspects as the latter only use the sacred scriptures as sole sources. Most Akhbaris believe no one can give new religious rules until the return of the Mahdi as the saviour of humanity.

Akhbari form a tiny minority within Shia Islam, with Usulis making up the mainstream majority. Akhbarism started as a movement with the writings of Muhammad Amin al-Astarabadi (d. 1627) and achieved its greatest influence in the late Safavid and early post-Safavid era. However, shortly thereafter Muhammad Baqir Behbahani (d. 1792), along with other Usuli mujtahids, crushed the Akhbari movement. Today it is found primarily in the Basra area of southern Iraq (where they form the majority in many districts) although no longer in the city. They are also found in the island nation of Bahrain, Hyderabad, India and different cities of Pakistan (Karachi, Sehwan, Hyderabad, Lahore, Faisalabad, Chakwaal, and Gojar Khan) with reportedly "only a handful of Shi'i ulama" remaining Akhbari "to the present day."

Background
Akhbaris consider themselves to be bounded by the Hadith of the two weighty things, where the Islamic prophet Muhammad instructed his followers to follow the Quran and Ahl al-Bayt. Therefore, even for new events occurring during the Major Occultation, Akhbaris continue to follow traditions of Ahlul Bayt, as per the saying of Imam Muhammad al-Mahdi where he said "As for the new events, which will occur (during my occultation) turn to the narrators of our traditions, because they are my proof to you, while I am the proof of Allah to them" Akhbari reject fatāwa based on ijtihad, they also reject the permissibility of writing exegesis of the Qur'an without quoting the narrations of the infallible Ahlu l-Bayt. Akhbari quote the Hadith ath-Thaqalayn and several authentic traditions of the Twelve Imāms to prohibit the practice of exegesis. Akhbaris do not believe in generalization of Hadith, they say Hadith is either right or wrong; further they believe that Hadiths compiled in The Four Books of Shias are reliable.
It is reported that Imam Muhammad al-Mahdi acknowledged Kitab al-Kafi (which is among The Four Books of Shias) and said "al-Kafi is sufficient for our Shia (followers)".
Where Usulis doubt the credibility of this saying as author of Kitab al-Kafi never quoted the same.
In short, the gist of Akhbārī ideology is that nothing but the aḥadīth of the Infallible can serve as authoritative evidence in Islam. Akhbārīs also differ from Usūlīs in their rejection of the Guardianship of the Islamic Jurists, arguing that preachers of religion have no role in politics,  clerics should advise political leaders but not govern themselves. Akhbaris believe in the separation of religion and state in absence of Twelfth Imam, they say that only an infallible ruling Imam has a right to combine religion and state; and which will be accomplished only after the arrival of awaited Shia Imam.

Usūlism evolved on the basis of Usul al-fiqh (the hypothetical concepts and perceptions of some scholars) centuries after the major occultation. Among the earliest Shī‘a ulamā''' such as Muhammad ibn Ya'qub al-Kulayni and Ibn Babawaiyya, the most important activity was transmission of a ḥadīth.

At this time, the Shī‘a distinguished themselves from the Sunni in the category of law, which employed such methods as qiyas "analogical reasoning" and exegesis". However, the Shī‘a developed law directly from the traditions of the Imāms.

Initially during the Buyid period, the Twelver ulamā' considered that since the Imām had gone into Occultation and his Nā'ib al-Khass was no longer present, all the functions invested in the Imām had lapsed. The principal functions of the Imām had been:
 Leading the Holy War (jihad)
 Division of the booty (qismat al-fay)
 Leading the Friday Prayer (salat al-juma)
 Putting judicial decisions into effect (tanfidh al-ahkam)
 Imposing legal penalties (iqamat al-hudud)
 Receiving the religious taxes of zakāt and khums.

However, it soon became apparent that the situation caused by the lapse of functions of the Hidden Imām was extremely impractical and left the Twelver Shī‘a community at a great disadvantage, with no leadership, no organization and no financial structure.

History
Akhbaris contend that, over the course of the history of Twelver Shi'ism since the Occultation, Usuli ulama have progressively usurped more and more of the functions of the Hidden Imam. They distinguish five stages in this usurpation.

First transgression
As early as the 5th century AH / 11th century CE, more than 150 years after the Occultation of the 12th Imām, Shaykhu t-Ta'ifa reinterpreted the doctrine to allow delegation of the Imām's judicial authority to those who had studied fiqh. Although he implies in his writings that this function should only be undertaken by the ulama if there is no one else to do it.

Shaykhu t-Taifa considered the ulamā' the best agents of the donor to distribute religious taxes since they knew to whom it should be distributed. Nevertheless, individuals were free to do this themselves if they wished. He allowed fuqahā' to organize Friday prayers in absence of the Imām or his special representative.

The prominent Shī‘a scholars who rejected this thesis were:
 `Alam al-Huda
 Ibn Idris
 Allamah al-Hilli

It is to be noted that `Alam al-Huda was from among the Shaykhu t-Taifa's group.

Second transgression
By the 13th century, Muhaqqiq al-Hilli was able to advance these concepts very considerably. He extended the judicial role of the ulama to iqamat al-hudud the imposition of penalties by ulama themselves. In his writings it is possible to see the evolution in his thinking whereby the fuqahā' develop from the deputies of the donor for the distribution of religious taxes in his early writings to being the deputies of the Hidden Imām for collection and distribution of the taxes in his later works. In effect, transgressing the limits set by Shaykhu t-Taifa (two centuries earlier) in his first transgression.

Third transgression
Muhaqqiq al-Karkhi (About 300 years after the second transgression) was the first to suggest, arguing from the hadith of ‘Umar ibn Hanzala, that the ulama were the Nā'ib al-'Amm  (general representative) of the Hidden Imām. But he restricted his application of this argument to the assumption of the duty of leading Friday prayers.

Fourth transgression
It was Shahīd ath-Thānī who took the concept of Nā'ib al-'Amm to its logical conclusion in the religious sphere and applied it to all of the religious functions and prerogatives of the Hidden Imām. Thus the judicial authority of the ulamā' now became a direct reflection of the authority of the Imām himself. It was now obligatory to pay the religious taxes directly to the ulamā' as the trustees of the Imām for distribution and the donor who distributed these himself was considered to obtain no reward. This is in direct contradiction to limits set by prior transgressions.

Furthermore, Shahīd ath-Thānī extended the range of those eligible to receive money from zakāt to include religious students and the ulamā' themselves, who thus became the recipients of the money as trustees of students. Even in the field of defensive jihād, Shahīd ath-Thānī identified a role for the ulamā'. Only in the field of offensive jihād did he allow that the role of Hidden Imām had lapsed pending his return.

Although the aforementioned scholars were not mujtahids in their full capacity, they introduced innovative concepts into Shī‘a theology which later formed the basis of the exegetical school. Their innovations were sharply criticized by prominent Shī‘a scholars of their time and thus, remained mostly theoretical.

The traditional Shī‘a doctrine was, by its nature, fatal to the leadership of any regime except that of Imām al-Mahdi since they believed that an Islamic state can be established only under the leadership of an infallible Imām. Thus, the Shī‘a had little role to play in supporting the decisions of the state, in contrast with the Sunni tendency of offering their full support to the Ottoman Empire.

This caused a great deal of paranoia to the states where the Shī‘a were in majority. By the end of Safavid era the situation had become intense due to the rise of imperialism on a global scale. It was necessary to develop an alternate ideology for the survival of Iranian state. This is when a group of ulamā' were encouraged to squeeze out the possibility of extending the state's control over the Shia majority; by whatever means necessary.

The revival of Akhbārism, or "neo-Akhbārism" as it became known, was under the dean of Karbala scholarship, Yusuf Al Bahrani (1695–1772), who led an intellectual assault on Usuli thought in the mid-18th century. An Akhbārī critique of Usulism had emerged in Bahrain at the beginning of the 18th century, partly spurred by the weaknesses of the Usuli sponsoring the Safavid empire. By succeeding to the role of dean of Karbala as one of the pre-eminent scholars of the age, al-Bahrani's extended this Bahrain-based debate to the rest of the Shī‘a world. 

Ayatollah Behbahani (a.r)
Under al-Bahrani, Usuli scholarship was considered impure but Bahrani was not politically influential, although his student, the famous Sheikh Al-Hurr al-Aamili in his book Amal al-amil writes "He was a mountain and ocean of knowledge, No one from among the previous scholars preceded his knowledge or reached his status". {Edit: This seems completely incorrect. The Al-Bahrani referred to in this quote is referring to Sayyid Hashim Al-Bahrani. However this article is relating it to another scholar; the previously mentioned Yusuf Bahraini, who died nearly a century after Sheikh Al-Hurr Aamili} It was Muhammad Baqir ibn Muhammad Akmal al-Wahid Behbahani who challenged and defeated the Akhbaris and eventually became the most politically influential cleric in Karbala in 1772. Bihbahani's theology was not welcomed by the Akhbaris. Although this controversy had begun as a minor disagreement on a few points, it eventually grew into a bitter, vituperative dispute culminating in Behbahani's declaration that the Akhbārīs were infidels (Kuffar). However, the dispute remained purely intellectual.

At first there was a large population of Akhbārī activists at the shrine cities of Iraq but it was Bihbahani who, at the end of the 18th century, reversed this and completely routed the Akhbārīs at Karbala and Najaf. South Iraq, Bahrain and a few cities in Iran such as Kirman remained Akhbārī strongholds for a few more decades but eventually the Usuli triumph was complete and only a handful of Shī‘a ulamā' remained Akhbārī to the present day.

After the theological coup brought about by al-Wahid Bihbahani by military methods, the Usuli school became instrumental to the Iranian regime.

Fifth transgression
During the first Russo-Persian War (1804–1813), Fath Ali Shah's son and heir, Abbas Mirza, who was conducting the campaign, turned to the new ulama and obtained from Shaykh Ja'far Kashif al-Ghita' and other eminent clerics in Najaf and Isfahan a declaration of jihad against the Russians, thus implicitly recognizing their authority to issue such a declaration – one of the functions of the Hidden Imām. Kashif al-Ghita used the opportunity to extract from the state acknowledgment of the ulama's right to collect the religious taxes of Khums."

This followed the pattern of other transgressions by overthrowing the limits of its prior (fourth) transgression.

Iranian Revolution
Following the Iranian Revolution, the Usūlī school has gained popularity among previously Akhbārī communities. Usuli clerical power reached its natural conclusion with control and domination of the state as promulgated through Vilayat al-Faqih under the authority of the Supreme Leader.

 Rejection of the Mujtahids 
Akhbārīs reject mujtahids. They practice this based on the last letter Imām Mahdi wrote to ‘Alī ibn Muhammad, fourth trusted follower of the Lesser Occultation. In the letter, Imām Zaman said:

Akhbārīs claim that only the Imāms may be described as āyat Allahs (Ayatollahs, "signs of God") based on the Hadith-e-Tariq, and that no one else has the right to ascribe this divinely appointed title to themselves. For example, the Hadith-i Tariq says: 
Historically it was only in the early 19th century that ordinary mujtahids began to describe themselves as 'Ayatollahs.' However, the powerful mujtahids existed long before the title of Ayatollah was adopted for high ranking Shia clergy.

Debate

Pro-Akhbari

 It can be noticed that the Usuli ulama have allegedly “usurped” one by one all the functions of the Hidden Imam, virtually ascribing themselves with his Imamate.
 Since the 1953 Iranian coup, the Usuli ulama have made countless transgressions from Wilayat al-Faqih to unity among Muslims (or what might be called Islamic ecumenism at the cost of Shia beliefs). The convergence of these trends can be seen heading towards the caliphate of mujtahideen, although with a different naming scheme.
 The fact that Akhbārism is a movement that started four centuries ago and was intellectually defeated is allegedly “false”.
 It is established that generalization that causes a fallible man's decision to gain the status of divine law is against the gist of Shia Islam. The Usuli appeal to "intellect" ('Aql) is similar to the Sunni qiyas. All early Shī‘a authorities are unanimous in rejecting Sunni qiyas (deductive analogy).

Anti-Akhbari
 Akhbārīs claim to follow Hadith directly, without the need for generalisation, or of finding the reason for the decision.  This, according to Usulis, is a logical impossibility. Hadith takes the form of case law, that is to say, the narration of decisions taken in a concrete situation. To "follow" such a decision one must know which features of the situation are or are not relevant to the decision, as exactly the same set of facts will never occur twice. Therefore, some degree of generalisation is unavoidable, even on the most literal view: the choice is simply between mechanical generalisation and intelligent generalisation.
 Regarding Islamic laws, there are various issues faced by Muslims in their daily lives. e.g. doubts in salāt'' and their corrections, conditions which invalidate a fast and the relevant compensations, rulings vis à vis correctness or incorrectness of various social and business practices e.g. Investing in Mutual Funds, Use of alcohol-based perfumes and medicines, etc.
 Akhbaris believe in the corruption of the Quran (tahrif) based on the fabricated ahadith, something that is overwhelmingly rejected as a mainstream Shia belief by the Usuli scholars. 
 Akhbaris do not allow any evaluation of the Shia hadiths, understanding them all to be entirely authentic. This is rejected by the Usuli scholars who point out to, for example, contradictory hadiths. 
 Akhbaris engage in illogical fallacy believing the undisputed authenticity of all the hadiths, but at the same time accepting the belief in corruption of the Quran, as alluded to by some (fabricated) hadiths.

Prominent Akhbari scholars

 Yusuf al-Bahrani
 Abdullah al Samahiji
 Salih Al-Karzakani
 Mohsen Fayz Kashani
 Syed Riyaz Uddin Hyder
 Syed Taqi Uddin Hyder 
 Syed Waheed Uddin Hyder

See also
Ahl al-Hadith
Salafi movement

References

 Rival Empires of Trade and Imami Shiism in Eastern Arabia, 1300-1800, Juan Cole, International Journal of Middle East Studies, Vol. 19, No. 2, (May 1987), pp. 177–203
 Andrew J. Newman, The Nature of the Akhbārī/Uṣūlī Dispute in Late Ṣafawid Iran. Part 1: 'Abdallāh al-Samāhijī's "Munyat al-Mumārisīn Bulletin of the School of Oriental and African Studies, University of London, Vol. 55, No. 1 (1992), pp. 22–51
 Killing of Prophet Muhammad's daughter

Shia Islam
Twelver Shi'ism
Ja'fari jurisprudence
Fatwas